Ski and snowboard locks are a special form of lock used by people in snow sports (skis, snowboarders, cross country ski) to protect their equipment whilst they are not around.
Ski and Snowboard locks come in many shapes and sizes but the most common today is cable locks.

Cable locks
Cable locks are the most common type of lock used on the snow. Cable locks designed specifically for the snow are generally thinner than typical locks for bikes. This is to make them more lightweight as the user often must carry them around with them during the day. 
Cable locks are fastened by simply wrapping the cable around the skis or board (and through any loops in the binding if available) and then clicking back into the main body. They are usually fastened with a code or with a key requiring oftentimes that the user remove their gloves which can be unpleasant in very cold weather.

Tether locks
Tether locks are probably the second most common type of lock seen on the mountain and protecting equipment. These are typically more rugged and heavy weight than the cable locks which increases the protection they can provide at the expense of convenience. The user is still generally required to carry the lock around with them during the day.

Tether locks can only be securely fastened if the equipment has some sort of closed loop (for example on the bindings of snowboards). The tether at one end must wrap around the equipment and the lock at the other must then thread through the tether. The lock can then be used to clip on to any fixed object. They are usually fastened with a code or with a key once again requiring that the user remove their gloves to operate.

Rack locks
Rack locks are another form of lock common at many European and American ski resorts. They provide a high level of security and are generally smaller and more convenient than either cable or tether locks. One of the downfalls of rack locks are that they must be used in conjunction with certain types of ski racks which are not found at all ski resorts. Another is that they only work at locations where  these racks are located meaning less freedom.

The basic principle behind the rack lock is as follows: To begin, skis are placed in the ski rack, and a pin is used to fix them into place so they cannot be removed. The rack lock then ensures that the pin cannot be removed by anyone other than the owner. Rack locks are always fastened with a key.

Wireless locks

A newer proposed solution is a lock which does not physically restrict the movement of the equipment. Instead, it uses sensors and alarms to detect theft and raise a siren in an attempt to deter thieves. The device is securely mounted on each ski (or a single for snowboards) via a tough adhesive tape and/or a screw. The unit is controlled by an app on the user’s smart phone. The unit can detect movement when armed and trigger a siren. This means that no physical device must be carried around with the user except their smartphone.

References

Locks (security device)